Nikola Mirotić (born 11 February 1991) is a Montenegrin-Spanish professional basketball player and the team captain for FC Barcelona of the Spanish Liga ACB and the EuroLeague. The power forward is a four-time All-EuroLeague Team member, and previously played for Real Madrid of the Liga ACB. Mirotić was drafted with the 23rd pick in the 2011 NBA draft, and played in the NBA from 2014 for the Chicago Bulls, New Orleans Pelicans and Milwaukee Bucks, before returning to Spain in the 2019 offseason.

Early life
Growing up in Montenegro, football was Mirotić's true passion. As he got older, his family realized his height could be a lot more useful for another sport. At the age of 13, his grandfather introduced him to basketball. Mirotić started playing basketball with the Joker School in Podgorica run by retired professional basketball player Jadran Vujačić.

In the summer of 2005, at the age of 14, Mirotić signed a junior contract with Real Madrid.

Professional career

Real Madrid (2008–2014)
After playing for the Real Madrid juniors from 2006 to 2008, Mirotić signed with the Real Madrid senior team in 2008. During the 2010–11 Euroleague season, he emerged as one of his team's most valuable players, and won the EuroLeague Rising Star award. In April 2011, he signed a five-year contract extension with Real Madrid. With Real Madrid, he won the Spanish King's Cup and the Spanish Supercup in 2012.

On 23 June 2011, Mirotić was selected by the Houston Rockets with the 23rd overall pick in the 2011 NBA draft. He was later traded to the Minnesota Timberwolves, and again to the Chicago Bulls on draft night.

In the 2012–13 Euroleague season, he finished second in the EuroLeague Rising Star voting to Kostas Papanikolaou, and he was named to the All-EuroLeague Second Team. In May 2014, he was named to the All-EuroLeague Second Team, for the second consecutive season.

In a total of 97 EuroLeague games for Real Madrid, Mirotić averaged 10.8 points and 4.5 rebounds per game.

Chicago Bulls (2014–2018)

2014–15 season
On 18 July 2014, Mirotić signed with the Chicago Bulls to a reported three-year, $16.6 million contract. In addition, Mirotić was required to pay $3 million to Real Madrid for his contract buyout.

On 19 December 2014, Mirotić scored a then career-high 27 points, as he converted all six of his three-pointers, in a 103–97 win over the Memphis Grizzlies. On 5 January 2015, he was named the Eastern Conference Rookie of the Month for games played in December. During the NBA's All-Star Weekend, Mirotić played for World Team in the Rising Stars Challenge. He scored 16 points on 6-of-9 shooting from the field in the World's 121–112 win over Team USA. On 1 March, he scored a career-high 29 points in a loss to the Los Angeles Clippers. With injuries impacting teammates during the month of March, Mirotić was expected to fill a larger role for his team. He averaged 20.8 points and 7.6 rebounds while playing 30.8 minutes per game. In his rookie season, Mirotić averaged 10.2 points, 4.9 rebounds and 1.2 assists in 82 games, giving him the recognition as a candidate for the Rookie of the Year Award. Mirotić finished second in Rookie of the Year voting with 335 votes behind Andrew Wiggins who received 604 votes. He played his first post-season game in the NBA on 18 April 2015 in Game 1 of the Bulls' first-round series match-up against the Milwaukee Bucks. In 13 minutes off the bench, he recorded 5 points and 5 rebounds.

2015–16 season
At the beginning of the 2015–16 season, Mirotić had a starting role ahead of All-Star center Joakim Noah. He scored a team-high 19 points in the season opening win over the Cleveland Cavaliers. He started in all 18 games to begin the season, coming off the bench for the first time on 9 December against the Boston Celtics, scoring 10 points in 22 minutes of action. He continued coming off the bench following 9 December, in a back-up role to Taj Gibson. His next start came on 21 December against the Brooklyn Nets, as he started at small forward in place of Tony Snell. On 1 January, he recorded 17 points and a career-high seven assists in a 108–81 win over the New York Knicks. On 27 January, he was diagnosed with an acute appendicitis and was subsequently ruled out until after the All-Star break. He returned to action on 5 March against the Houston Rockets after missing 16 games. On 23 March, he scored a career-high 35 points in a loss to the New York Knicks.

2016–17 season
On 26 December 2016, less than two weeks after falling out of the rotation for a couple of games, Mirotić recorded a then season-high 20 points in a 90–85 win over the Indiana Pacers. After not playing by coach's decision in two straight games in early March so that management and the coaching staff could look at Joffrey Lauvergne, Mirotić landed on the inactive list. On 13 March, he returned from a three-game absence and scored 24 points on five three-pointers in a 115–109 win over the Charlotte Hornets. On 22 March, he scored a season-high 28 points in a 117–95 win over the Detroit Pistons. Four days later, he tied his season high with another 28-point effort in a 109–94 win over the Milwaukee Bucks. He had a third 28-point game on 30 March in a 99–93 win over the Cleveland Cavaliers. He had six three-pointers against both Milwaukee and Cleveland, becoming the first Bulls player to hit six or more three-pointers in back-to-back games.

2017–18 season
On 25 September 2017, Mirotić re-signed with the Bulls. On 17 October 2017, Mirotić was sent to the hospital after engaging in a physical altercation with teammate Bobby Portis during practice. Portis punched Mirotić in the face resulting in Mirotić suffering a concussion and multiple facial fractures. Mirotić made his season debut on 8 December, scoring six points in 14 minutes in a 119–111 overtime win over the Charlotte Hornets. On 11 December, he scored 24 points in his first start of the season in a 108–85 win over the Boston Celtics. He hit 9 of 14 shots and grabbed eight rebounds in his third appearance. On 13 December, he scored 29 points on 11-of-18 shooting with nine rebounds in a 103–100 win over the Utah Jazz. On 26 December, he came off the bench to score 24 points in 28 minutes, as the Bulls won for the eighth time in 10 games, beating the Milwaukee Bucks 115–106.

New Orleans Pelicans (2018–2019)
On 1 February 2018, Mirotić was traded, along with a 2018 second-round pick, to the New Orleans Pelicans in exchange for Ömer Aşık, Tony Allen, Jameer Nelson, a 2018 first-round pick, and the right to swap 2021 second round picks with the Pelicans. He made his debut for the Pelicans two days later, scoring 18 points in a 118–107 loss to the Minnesota Timberwolves. On 10 February, he recorded 21 points and 16 rebounds in a 138–128 double-overtime win over the Brooklyn Nets. On 6 April, he scored a season-high 31 points and tied a season best with 16 rebounds in a 122–103 win over the Phoenix Suns. Three days later, he recorded 24 points and 16 rebounds in a 113–100 win over the Los Angeles Clippers, helping the Pelicans clinch a playoff spot. In Game 1 of the Pelicans' first-round playoff series against the Portland Trail Blazers, Mirotić recorded 16 points, 11 rebounds and four blocks in a 97–95 win. In Game 3, Mirotić scored a career playoff-best 30 points, as the Pelicans beat the Trail Blazers 119–102 to take a 3–0 lead in the series.

In the Pelicans' season opener on 17 October 2018, Mirotić scored 30 points on 6 of 8 from 3-point range in a 131–112 win over the Houston Rockets. Two days later, he scored a career-high 36 points in a 149–129 win over the Sacramento Kings. On 5 November, he had 16 points and matched a career high with 16 rebounds in a 122–116 loss to the Oklahoma City Thunder. On 9 January, he returned to action against the Cleveland Cavaliers after missing 12 games due to an ankle injury.

Milwaukee Bucks (2019)
On 7 February 2019, Mirotić was traded to the Milwaukee Bucks in a three-team trade involving Jason Smith, Stanley Johnson, and Thon Maker. He missed the first four games with the Bucks upon being acquired with a calf injury, making his debut on 21 February against the Boston Celtics. He missed the final 11 regular-season games after suffering a fractured left thumb against the Los Angeles Lakers on 19 March. He made his return in the Bucks' opening game of the playoffs.

Barcelona (2019–present)

On 6 July 2019, Mirotić signed a three-year deal, with the option of an extension through to 2023, with FC Barcelona of the Liga ACB and the EuroLeague. According to sources, Mirotić's contract was worth €26 million, making him the highest-paid basketball player in Europe. On 27 June 2020, Mirotic was awarded the league's Most Valuable Player award. He became the fifth player in Liga Endesa history to have multiple MVP awards, joining Darryl Middleton, Arvydas Sabonis, Luis Scola and Felipe Reyes. Mirotić finished the season averaging 19.5 points and 5.7 rebounds per game. He extended his contract until 2025 on 25 September 2020.

In the 2021–22 season, he won his first EuroLeague MVP award, becoming the first Barcelona player to win the award in 14 years.

National team career
Mirotić was a member of the junior national team of Spain. He helped Spain's U20 national team win the bronze medal at the 2010 FIBA Europe Under-20 Championship, where he was named to the All-Tournament Team. He also led Spain to the gold medal in 2011. Mirotić was the top scorer and MVP of the tournament, averaging 27 points (tournament record) and 10 rebounds per game.

In June 2015, Mirotić was named by head coach Sergio Scariolo as one of 17 candidates to try out for the senior Spain men's national basketball team that would play at the EuroBasket 2015. Mirotić made Spain's final 12-man roster, and he went on to win a gold medal at the tournament, in September 2015. He also played with Spain at the 2016 Summer Olympics, where he won a bronze medal.

Personal life
Mirotić and his wife, Nina Vujačić, have a son named Aleksandar, who was born in May 2013. His wife is the daughter of his former coach and mentor, Jadran Vujačić, who also played professional basketball with Borac Čačak, KK Partizan, and Budućnost Titograd. Even though he represents the Spain national basketball team, he said that he is happy and proud to be Montenegrin.

Mirotić is an ethnic Serb and a Serbian Orthodox Christian. He received the Order of St. Sava in May 2017. Mirotić has participated in prayer walks and protests in Podgorica against the controversial religious law concerning the Serbian Orthodox Church.

Awards and accomplishments

Professional career
 Spanish ACB League Finals MVP: (2021)
 3× Spanish King's Cup Winner: (2012, 2014, 2021)
 2× Spanish Supercup Winner: (2012, 2013)
 2× Spanish ACB League Champion: (2013, 2021)
 All-EuroLeague First Team: (2021)
 2× All-EuroLeague Second Team: (2013, 2014)
 Spanish ACB League MVP: (2013, 2020)
 4× All-ACB Team: (2013, 2014, 2020, 2021)
 Spanish King's Cup MVP: (2014)
 2× EuroLeague Rising Star: (2011, 2012)
 FIBA Europe Under-20 Championship MVP: (2011)

Spain national team
Senior
 EuroBasket 2015: 
 2016 Summer Olympics: 
U-20
 2010 FIBA Europe Under-20 Championship: 
 2010 FIBA Europe Under-20 Championship: All-Tournament Team
 2011 FIBA Europe Under-20 Championship: 
 2011 FIBA Europe Under-20 Championship: All-Tournament Team (MVP)

Career statistics

NBA

Regular season

|-
| style="text-align:left;"| 
| style="text-align:left;"| Chicago
| 82 || 3 || 20.2 || .405 || .316 || .803 || 4.9 || 1.2 || .7 || .7 || 10.2
|-
| style="text-align:left;"| 
| style="text-align:left;"| Chicago
| 66 || 38 || 24.9 || .407 || .390 || .807 || 5.5 || 1.5 || .9 || .7 || 11.8
|-
| style="text-align:left;"| 
| style="text-align:left;"| Chicago
| 70 || 15 || 24.0 || .413 || .342 || .773 || 5.5 || 1.1 || .8 || .8 || 10.6
|-
| style="text-align:left;"| 
| style="text-align:left;"| Chicago
| 25 || 3 || 24.9 || .474 || .429 || .823 || 6.4 || 1.6 || .6 || .5 || 16.8
|-
| style="text-align:left;"| 
| style="text-align:left;"| New Orleans
| 30 || 11 || 29.1 || .427 || .335 || .810 || 8.2 || 1.4 || 1.0 || .9 || 14.6
|-
| style="text-align:left;"| 
| style="text-align:left;"| New Orleans
| 32 || 22 || 28.9 || .447 || .368 || .842 || 8.3 || 1.1 || .7 || .8 || 16.7
|-
| style="text-align:left;"| 
| style="text-align:left;"| Milwaukee
| 14 || 3 || 22.9 || .415 || .356 || .870 || 5.4 || 1.4 || .7 || .6 || 11.6
|-
| style="text-align:center;" colspan="2"| Career
| 319 || 95 || 24.2 || .423 || .359 || .808 || 5.9 || 1.3 || .8 || .7 || 12.3

Playoffs

|-
| style="text-align:left;"| 2015
| style="text-align:left;"| Chicago
| 11 || 0 || 14.9 || .303 || .233 || .800 || 2.7 || .8 || .5 || .5 || 5.7
|-
| style="text-align:left;"| 2017
| style="text-align:left;"| Chicago
| 6 || 6 || 27.0 || .340 || .286 || .800 || 5.0 || 1.5 || .7 || .5 || 8.7
|-
| style="text-align:left;"| 2018
| style="text-align:left;"| New Orleans
| 9 || 9 || 35.6 || .480 || .431 || .789 || 9.6 || 1.7 || 1.1 || 1.3 || 15.0
|-
| style="text-align:left;"| 2019
| style="text-align:left;"| Milwaukee
| 14 || 8 || 21.3 || .376 || .289 || .821 || 4.3 || .7 || .7 || .2 || 9.5
|-
| style="text-align:center;" colspan="2"| Career
| 40 || 23 || 21.3 || .388 || .318 || .805 || 5.2 || 1.1 || .8 || .6 || 9.6

Liga ACB

|-
| style="text-align:left;"| 2008–09
| style="text-align:left;"| Real Madrid
| 2 || 0 || 3.5 || .500 || .000 || .000 || .0 || .0 || .0 || .0 || 1.0
|-
| style="text-align:left;"| 2010–11
| style="text-align:left;"| Real Madrid
| 29 || 9 || 17.2 || .527 || .413 || .875 || 3.8 || .6 || .7 || .4 || 8.1
|-
| style="text-align:left;"| 2011–12
| style="text-align:left;"| Real Madrid
| 34 || 26 || 20.2 || .471 || .375 || .703 || 4.5 || .8 || .7 || .5 || 8.9
|-
| style="text-align:left;"| 2012–13
| style="text-align:left;"| Real Madrid
| 33 || 29 || 23.4 || .505 || .435 || .802 || 5.5 || .9 || .9 || .8 || 12.6
|-
| style="text-align:left;"| 2013–14
| style="text-align:left;"| Real Madrid
| 33 || 30 || 23.0 || .518 || .354 || .777 || 5.5 || 1.1 || 1.1 || .5 || 12.5
|-
| style="text-align:left;"| 2019–20
| style="text-align:left;"| FC Barcelona
| 20 || 19 || 26.8 || .518 || .330 || .911 || 5.8 || 1.4 || 1.1 || .7 || 20.0
|-
| style="text-align:left;"| 2020–21
| style="text-align:left;"| FC Barcelona
| 30 || 27 || 20.9 || .596 || .486 || .811 || 4.8 || .8 || .9 || .5 || 14.4
|-
| style="text-align:left;"| 2021–22
| style="text-align:left;"| FC Barcelona
| 30 || 28 || 22.3 || .540 || .430 || .826 || 5.2 || .8 || .5 || .4 || 14.8
|-
| style="text-align:center;" colspan="2"| Career
| 211 || 168 || 21.6 || .526 || .406 || .817 || 4.9 || .8 || .8 || .5 || 12.5
|-

EuroLeague

|-
| style="text-align:left;"| 2008–09
| style="text-align:left;"| Real Madrid
| 1 || 0 || 2.1 || .000 || .000 || .000 || .0 || .0 || .0 || .0 || .0 || -1.0
|-
| style="text-align:left;"| 2010–11
| style="text-align:left;"| Real Madrid
| 20 || 0 || 15.0 || .500 || .387 || .857 || 3.3 || .6 || .5 || .5 || 6.6 || 8.2
|-
| style="text-align:left;"| 2011–12
| style="text-align:left;"| Real Madrid
| 16 || 15 || 23.1 || .525 || .439 || style="background:#CFECEC;"|.918 || 4.5 || .9 || .8 || .4 || 12.5 || 14.6
|-
| style="text-align:left;"| 2012–13
| style="text-align:left;"| Real Madrid
| 29 || 25 || 24.9 || .475 || .325 || .851 || 5.3 || .9 || .7 || .9 || 11.4 || 13.3
|-
| style="text-align:left;"| 2013–14
| style="text-align:left;"| Real Madrid
| 31 || 31 || 24.0 || .508 || .461 || .811 || 4.6 || 1.2 || 1.1 || .8 || 12.4 || 15.9
|-
| style="text-align:left;"| 2019–20
| style="text-align:left;"| Barcelona
| 28 || 28 || 27.8 || .483 || .331 || .869 || 6.9 || 1.6 || 1.1 || .3 || 19.0 || 22.5
|-
| style="text-align:left;"| 2020–21
| style="text-align:left;"| Barcelona
| 33 || 32 || 25.8 || .533 || .413 || .848 || 5.9 || 1.0 || 1.2 || .5 || 15.6 || 19.5
|-
| style="text-align:left;"| 2021–22
| style="text-align:left;"| Barcelona
| 38 || 38 || 24.4 || .570 || .463 || .876 || 5.2 || 1.4 || .9 || .3 || 16.9 || 20.1

References

External links
Nikola Mirotić at acb.com 

Mirotić's official website
Nikola Mirotić at euroleague.net

Nikola Mirotić at fibaeurope.com

1991 births
Living people
Basketball players at the 2016 Summer Olympics
Chicago Bulls players
FC Barcelona Bàsquet players
Houston Rockets draft picks
Liga ACB players
Medalists at the 2016 Summer Olympics
Members of the Serbian Orthodox Church
Milwaukee Bucks players
Montenegrin men's basketball players
Montenegrin expatriate basketball people in Spain
Montenegrin expatriate basketball people in the United States
National Basketball Association players from Montenegro
National Basketball Association players from Spain
Naturalised citizens of Spain
New Orleans Pelicans players
Olympic basketball players of Spain
Olympic bronze medalists for Spain
Olympic medalists in basketball
Palencia Baloncesto players
Power forwards (basketball)
Real Madrid Baloncesto players
Recipients of the Order of St. Sava
Serbs of Montenegro
Spanish men's basketball players
Spanish expatriate basketball people in the United States
Spanish people of Montenegrin descent
Spanish people of Serbian descent
Sportspeople from Podgorica